Julien Berger is a Belgian rugby union player who currently plays for his national side and the French club La Rochelle as a scrum-half. He has played for La Rochelle since 2009 and has played 14 games, but had only started in 5 (during the 2011–12 season).

References

External links
  Julien Berger profile.

Belgian rugby union players
Living people
1990 births
Belgian expatriate rugby union players
Expatriate rugby union players in France
Belgian expatriate sportspeople in France
Belgium international rugby union players
Stade Rochelais players
Provence Rugby players
USON Nevers players
Rugby union scrum-halves